Deloneura millari, the Millar's buff, is a butterfly of the family Lycaenidae. It is found in South Africa, Eswatini and Mozambique. The habitat consists of coastal bush and moist savannah.

The wingspan is 23–27 mm for males and 24–29 mm for females. Adults are on wing from September to October and from March to May. There are two generations per year.

The larvae possibly feed on cyanobacteria species.

Subspecies
Deloneura millari millari (Eswatini and savannah and open coastal forest from the Eastern Cape along the coast to northern KwaZulu-Natal)
Deloneura millari dondoensis Pennington, 1953 (Dondo Forest in Mozambigue)

References

Butterflies described in 1906
Deloneura